Bossiney was a parliamentary constituency in Cornwall, one of a number of Cornish rotten boroughs. It returned two members of Parliament to the British House of Commons from 1552 until 1832, when it was abolished by the Great Reform Act.

History
Bossiney was one of a number of small parliamentary boroughs established in Cornwall during the Tudor period, and was not a town of any importance even when first enfranchised. The borough consisted of the hamlet of Bossiney itself and the nearby village of Trevena, both in the parish of Tintagel on the North Cornwall coast. In 1831, the borough contained only 67 houses, and had a population of 308.

The right to vote was vested in the mayor and freemen of the borough, collectively called the burgesses; the freedom of the borough was hereditary, passing to the eldest son of any burgess possessing freehold property within the borough. The number of burgesses was always small, with only 25 being entitled to vote in 1831. In 1816 Oldfield recorded that there were only nine voters, eight of whom belonged to the same family.

Like most of the tiny boroughs, Bossiney was completely under the control of its "patrons", who had such influence over the voters that they could in practice choose whoever they wanted as MPs. From the middle of the 18th century, the patrons were the Earl of Mount Edgcumbe and the Wortley family. Usually they chose one member each and, indeed, a formal agreement to that effect, dated 3 July 1752, survives. In Bossiney, the patrons habitually secured their interests by obtaining for the burgesses lucrative appointments in the customs-house at Padstow. In 1758, there was a dispute between Lord Edgcumbe and Samuel Martin, patron of nearby Camelford, over a commissionership of customs that both wanted for one of their constituents; a Camelford man was appointed, and at the election that followed in 1761 Edgcumbe was unable to secure the election of his candidate.

The abuse of government patronage was considered a scandal even in the 18th century, and in 1782 an act of Parliament was passed to disqualify the holders of certain posts, including customs officers, from voting. While the new law was not aimed specifically at Bossiney it had a more dramatic effect there than anywhere else: the borough established an unbeatable record at the general election of 1784, when so many of the burgesses were disqualified that there was only a single qualified voter (the vicar, Arthur Wade) to return the two MPs.

Bossiney was disfranchised by the Great Reform Act of 1832.

Members of Parliament

1553–1640
 Constituency created (1553 or possibly earlier)

1640–1832

Election results

Elections in the 1830s

 Caused by Stuart-Wortley's resignation

Notes

References

 Beatson, Robert (1807) "A Chronological Register of Both Houses of Parliament" London: Longman, Hurst, Rees & Orme 
 Brunton, D.; Pennington, D. H. (1954) Members of the Long Parliament London: George Allen & Unwin.
 Cobbett, William (1808) Cobbett's Parliamentary History of England, from the Norman Conquest in 1066 to the year 1803 London: Thomas Hansard
 Dyer, Peter (2005) Tintagel: a portrait of a parish. Cambridge: Cambridge Books.  A full list of the MPs is given as an appendix.
 Jansson, Maija (ed.) (1988), Proceedings in Parliament, 1614 (House of Commons) Philadelphia: American Philosophical Society 
 Oldfield, T. H. B. (1816) The Representative History of Great Britain and Ireland London: Baldwin, Cradock & Joy.
 Philbin, J. Holladay (1965) Parliamentary Representation 1832 - England and Wales New Haven: Yale University Press.
 Porritt, Edward; Porritt, Annie G. (1903) The Unreformed House of Commons Cambridge University Press.
 Smith, Henry Stooks (1973) The Parliaments of England from 1715 to 1847, 2nd ed., edited by F. W. S. Craig. Chichester: Parliamentary Reference Publications.
 Townshend, Heywood (1680) Historical Collections: or, An Exact Account of the Proceedings of the Four Last Parliaments of Q. Elizabeth (1680) 
 

Constituencies of the Parliament of the United Kingdom established in 1552
Constituencies of the Parliament of the United Kingdom disestablished in 1832
Parliamentary constituencies in Cornwall (historic)
Rotten boroughs
Tintagel